Lena Forsén, previously Soderberg (born Sjööblom; born 31 March 1951), is a Swedish model who appeared as a Playmate in the November 1972 issue of Playboy magazine, as Lenna Sjööblom. Her centerfold was photographed by Dwight Hooker. The image would later become a ubiquitous standard test image in the field of digital image processing, where the image is known as Lenna.

Career

Modelling 
Forsén's career began by modelling jewellery and for catalogues in Chicago, Illinois, after moving to the United States from Sweden to be an au pair for a family member. In 1972, she was shot for the centerfold of the November issue of Playboy magazine. After that, she moved to Rochester, New York, and became a "Shirley" – a Kodak model – while moonlighting as a bartender. Thereafter she appeared on a large number of Kodak publications, including in ads for products, in catalogs, and on instruction booklets.

Lenna 

A cropped version (the head and shoulder section) of her centerfold, known as Lenna, has become a standard test image that is often used to test algorithms in digital image processing. She was a guest at the 50th annual Conference of the Society for Imaging Science and Technology (IS&T) in 1997, where she gave a presentation about herself. Because of the ubiquity of her Playboy photo scan, she has been called the "first lady of the internet". The title was given to her by Jeff Seideman in a press release he issued announcing her appearance at the 50th annual IS&T Conference. In January 2019 she said that while she wished she had been better compensated, she was "really proud of that picture". However, in a short documentary titled Losing Lena that premiered in North America in November that year, she says, "I retired from modeling a long time ago. It’s time I retired from tech, too."

After modelling 
In 1997, Forsén worked for a government agency supervising disabled employees, archiving data using computers and scanners.

Personal life 
Forsén has been married twice, has three children, and multiple grandchildren.

See also 

 List of people in Playboy 1970–1979

References

External links 
 Lenna's centerfold in the Playboy Archive, November 1972, pp 138-140 
 
 A Complete Story of Lenna (with one new picture of her)
 The Lenna Story (contains a link to an un-cropped scan of the original Playboy centerfold)
 A video artwork inspired by Lenna's story

1970s Playboy Playmates
1951 births
Glamour models
Living people
Swedish female models
People notable for being the subject of a specific photograph
20th-century Swedish women